Afrixalus stuhlmanni is a species of frog in the family Hyperoliidae. It is endemic to Tanzania.

Its natural habitats are moist savanna, subtropical or tropical moist shrubland, shrub-dominated wetlands, swamps, freshwater marshes, arable land, rural gardens, urban areas, heavily degraded former forest, ponds, irrigated land, seasonally flooded agricultural land, and canals and ditches. It can tolerate many types of habitat and is common to abundant in some areas.

References

stuhlmanni
Frogs of Africa
Amphibians of Kenya
Amphibians of Malawi
Amphibians of Mozambique
Amphibians of Tanzania
Amphibians described in 1893
Taxa named by Georg Johann Pfeffer
Taxonomy articles created by Polbot